This is a list of lighthouses in Saint Martin.

Lighthouses

See also
 Lists of lighthouses and lightvessels

References

External links
 

San Martin
Lighthouses